Simpson Manufacturing Company is an engineering firm and building materials producer in the United States that produces structural connectors, anchors, and products for new construction and retrofitting.

The company was founded by Barclay Simpson in Oakland in 1956, as a successor to his father's window screen company. Simpson manufactured joist hangers and the company's subsidiary Simpson Strong-Tie Co. Inc. became a dominant producer of structural connectors in North America and Europe. The company subsequently moved to Pleasanton and went public in 1994.

References

Industrial supply companies
Companies listed on the New York Stock Exchange
Manufacturing companies established in 1956
1956 establishments in California